Darisha K. Parker (born 1975) is an American politician serving as a member of the Pennsylvania House of Representatives from the 198th district.

Elected in November 2020, she assumed office on December 1, 2020.

Education 
Parker graduated from Lankenau Environmental Science Magnet High School and earned a Bachelor of Arts degree from Bennett College.

Career 
Parker worked as a legislative assistant for Rosita Youngblood. She was elected to the Pennsylvania House of Representatives in November 2020 and assumed office on December 1, 2020, succeeding Youngblood.

References 

African-American state legislators in Pennsylvania
Living people
Democratic Party members of the Pennsylvania House of Representatives
21st-century American politicians
21st-century American women politicians
21st-century African-American politicians
21st-century African-American women
1975 births